Tricorynus lucidus is a species of beetles in the family Ptinidae. It is found in North America.

References

 White, Richard E. (1965). "A Revision of the Genus Tricorynus of North America (Coleoptera: Anobiidae)". Miscellaneous Publications of the Entomological Society of America, vol. 4, no. 7, 285–368.
 White, Richard E. (1982). "A catalog of the Coleoptera of America north of Mexico. Family: Anobiidae". US Department of Agriculture, Agriculture Handbook, 529–570.

Further reading

 Arnett, R.H. Jr., M. C. Thomas, P. E. Skelley and J. H. Frank. (eds.). (2002). American Beetles, Volume II: Polyphaga: Scarabaeoidea through Curculionoidea. CRC Press LLC, Boca Raton, FL.
 Arnett, Ross H. (2000). American Insects: A Handbook of the Insects of America North of Mexico. CRC Press.
 Richard E. White. (1983). Peterson Field Guides: Beetles. Houghton Mifflin Company.

Bostrichoidea
Beetles described in 1965